Under the Hula Moon is a 1995 American crime comedy film directed by Jeff Celentano and starring Stephen Baldwin, Emily Lloyd, Chris Penn, and Musetta Vander.

Plot
Buzzard "Buzz" Wall and his wife Betty are an eccentric young couple living in a trailer in the desert outside Cactus Gulch, Arizona. Buzz dreams of becoming rich off his new invention, a green 150 SPF sunscreen called Cammo, and moving to Hawaii, while Betty dreams of winning the lottery and starting a family. Buzz is unable to get funding for his product, but in his moment of despair, he sees a vision of the ghost of King Kamehameha, who tells him he will soon embark on a perilous journey that will reveal his destiny.

Elsewhere in the desert, Buzz's half-brother, Turkey "Turk" Dickson, has escaped prison. He kills a man for his van and makes it to Cactus Gulch, where he finds Buzz and Betty's trailer. It quickly becomes apparent that Turk is completely deranged, and he threatens the couple for money. When Buzz reveals they only have $65, Turk gags and binds his brother and attempts to rape Betty. However, he is interrupted by a knock at the door for Betty, who has won a prize of $10,000 from a magazine. Turk poses as Buzz in order to accept the check, and then kidnaps Betty, leaving Buzz bound and bleeding in the trailer.

Across town, Buzz's ex-girlfriend Maya Gundinger bemoans her job as a news reporter in a small town, dreaming of covering more important stories. She sees the broadcast of Betty's win on TV, realizes that the man is not Buzz, and finds Buzz in his trailer. Once Maya frees him, the two hit the road to rescue Betty. Maya insists on filming everything, which aggravates Buzz.

Along the way, Buzz proves himself to be brave and able to overcome temptation, guided by the spirit of Kamehameha.

Turk ditches his car at the Mexican border and he and Betty walk through the desert until they reach a saloon, where Buzz and Maya find them. Buzz convinces a gang of thugs to confront Turk for him, but eventually runs in to fight Turk himself. Buzz nearly chokes Turk to death, but the spirit of Kamehameha disapproves of this, and Buzz lets go. The floor then caves in and the two fall into a secret underground DEA base, where Turk is arrested.

Buzz and Betty return home, where they both find jobs as burger flippers. Thanks to Maya's coverage, the Turk case becomes headlining news for weeks on end. The couple are then visited by the United States Marine Corps, who are interested in buying Buzz's Cammo sunscreen. Sales of Cammo are so successful that the couple are able to move to Hawaii. In the final shot, Buzz and Betty are seen sailing into the sunset on an outrigger canoe with their new son, Buzz Jr.

Cast
 Stephen Baldwin as Buzz Wall
 Emily Lloyd as Betty Wall
 Chris Penn as Turk Dickson
 Musetta Vander as Maya Gundinger
 Pruitt Taylor Vince as Bob
 Edie McClurg as Dolly
 Robert Madrid as Juan
 Carel Struycken as Clyde
 Ray Bumatai as King
 Debra Christofferson as Kim Jones
 Billy Campbell as Marvin (as Bill Campbell)
 Molly McClure as Grandmother
 Deep Roy as Bus Driver
 Bobby McGee as Leon
 Willard E. Pugh as Duane
 Gary Carlos Cervantes as Bandito (as Gary Cervantes)
 Luis Contreras as Bandito
 Patrick Dollaghen as Agent Kepner
 R. Lee Ermey as Lt. Col. J.P. McIntire
 Jeff Celentano as Chuck (uncredited)

External links
 Plot description at the New York Times
 Plot description at TVGuide.com
 
 

1995 films
1995 comedy films
1995 independent films
1990s American films
1990s comedy road movies
1990s crime comedy films
1990s English-language films
American comedy road movies
American crime comedy films
American independent films
Films about kidnapping in the United States
Films directed by Jeff Celentano
Films set in Arizona
English-language crime comedy films